Lucia Francisca "Susi" Susanti Haditono (born 11 February 1971) is an Indonesia retired badminton player. Relatively small of stature, she combined quick and graceful movement with elegant shotmaking technique, and is regarded by many as one of the greatest women's singles players of all time. She is the first Indonesian Olympic gold medalist.

Career 
Susanti won the women's singles gold medal at the 1992 Olympic Games in Barcelona, Spain and the bronze medal at the 1996 Olympic Games in Atlanta, United States. She retired from the world badminton circuit not long after her marriage to Alan Budikusuma (who had also won a badminton singles gold medal at the 1992 Summer Olympics) in February 1997. Susanti was the most dominant women's singles player in the first half of the 1990s, winning the All England Open in 1990, 1991, 1993 and 1994, the World Badminton Grand Prix Finals five times consecutively from 1990 to 1994 as well as in 1996, and the IBF World Championships in 1993. She is the only female player to hold the Olympic, World Championship, and All-England singles titles simultaneously. She won the Japan Open three times and the Indonesian Open six times. She also won numerous Badminton Grand Prix series events and five Badminton World Cups. She led the Indonesian team to victory over perennial champion China in the 1994 and 1996 Uber Cup (women's world team) competitions. All of this came during a relatively strong period in women's international badminton. Her chief competitors early in her prime years were the Chinese players Tang Jiuhong and Huang Hua, and, later, China's Ye Zhaoying and the Korean Bang Soo-hyun.

Susanti was inducted into the International Badminton Federation (IBF, currently BWF) Hall of Fame in May 2004, and received the Herbert Scheele Trophy in 2002. She lit the flame at the 2018 Asian Games opening ceremony.

Playing style 
Susanti was an extremely durable defensive player who liked to instigate long rallies to wear down her opponent's stamina and invite errors. That style was in contrast to most of the top female players of her time such as Bang Soo-hyun, Tang Jiuhong, Huang Hua, and Ye Zhaoying, who employed a more aggressive style.

Susanti's matches against top-tier opponents were characteristically slow-paced and long, especially in the era of 15 points system when a player could only earn a point when she or he held the serve. Susanti relied on deep clears to the back line, limiting the chance of a fast-paced exchange, mixed with tight drop shots, forcing her opponent to cover the entire court. Susanti frequently covered her backhand side with overhead forehands, by relying on her quickness and back-arching suppleness. Relatively short, she often stretched her legs very wide to take low shots at the corners or away from her position. Developed from training, this leg-stretching, almost balletic maneuver became a signature pose which sometimes ended with a full leg split. In the later years of her career, Susanti incorporated more smashing into her repertoire, enough to put throw off opponents expecting only a game of attrition.

Personal life 
She is married to Alan Budikusuma, a men's badminton Olympic gold medalist (also in 1992) and one of the top men's players in the history of the sport, a former Chinese Indonesian badminton player who excelled at the world level from the late 1980s to the mid-1990s. Together they have three children, Laurencia Averina, born 1999, Albertus Edward, born 2000, Sebastianus Fredrick, born 2003. When the eldest daughter was born, Indonesia was rocked by a series of civil outbreaks and violence. Susanti decided to name her daughter Laurencia Averina Wiratama, which means “peace”, hoping that he would bring about peace in the nation.

In popular culture
A biopic in Indonesian based on Susanti's life story, entitled Susi Susanti: Love All directed by Sim F with Laura Basuki playing the titular role and Dion Wiyoko as Alan Budikusuma was released on 24 October 2019.

Awards and nominations

Achievements

Olympic Games 
Women's singles

World Championships 
Women's singles

World Cup 
Women's singles

Asian Games 
Women's singles

Southeast Asian Games 
Women's singles

World Junior Championships 
The Bimantara World Junior Championships was an international invitation badminton tournament for junior players. It was held in Jakarta, Indonesia from 1987 to 1991.

Girls' singles

Girls' doubles

Mixed doubles

IBF World Grand Prix (38 titles, 11 runners-up)
The World Badminton Grand Prix was sanctioned by the International Badminton Federation from 1983 to 2006.

Women's singles

Women's doubles

 IBF Grand Prix tournament
 IBF Grand Prix Finals tournament

IBF International (1 title, 2 runners-up)
Women's singles

Women's doubles

Mixed doubles

Invitational Tournament 
Women's singles

Record against selected opponents 
Record against year-end Finals finalists, World Championships semi-finalists, and Olympic quarter-finalists.

References

External links 
 Setelah Sepuluh Tahun Gantung Raket 
 Susi Susanti Sempat Tidak Tahu Masuk Daftar Rekor dunia 
 
 
 

1971 births
Living people
People from Tasikmalaya
Sportspeople from West Java
Indonesian sportspeople of Chinese descent
Hakka sportspeople
Indonesian Roman Catholics
Indonesian female badminton players
Badminton players at the 1992 Summer Olympics
Badminton players at the 1996 Summer Olympics
Olympic badminton players of Indonesia
Olympic gold medalists for Indonesia
Olympic bronze medalists for Indonesia
Olympic medalists in badminton
Medalists at the 1992 Summer Olympics
Medalists at the 1996 Summer Olympics
Badminton players at the 1990 Asian Games
Badminton players at the 1994 Asian Games
Asian Games silver medalists for Indonesia
Asian Games bronze medalists for Indonesia
Asian Games medalists in badminton
Medalists at the 1990 Asian Games
Medalists at the 1994 Asian Games
Competitors at the 1987 Southeast Asian Games
Competitors at the 1989 Southeast Asian Games
Competitors at the 1991 Southeast Asian Games
Competitors at the 1995 Southeast Asian Games
Competitors at the 1997 Southeast Asian Games
Southeast Asian Games gold medalists for Indonesia
Southeast Asian Games silver medalists for Indonesia
Southeast Asian Games medalists in badminton
World No. 1 badminton players